Dasht Gonbad (also Romanized as Dasht-e Gonbad) is a village in Chashm Rural District, Shahmirzad District, Mehdishahr County, Semnan Province, Iran. At the 2006 census, its population was 45, in 13 families.

References 

Populated places in Mehdishahr County